The Battle of Małogoszcz took place on 24 February 1863 near Małogoszcz in the Holy Cross voivodeship. It was the one of biggest battles of the January Uprising. Polish general Marian Langiewicz began concentrating his forces in the Holy Cross Mountains; he wanted to attack Warsaw with them, but the Russians unveiled his attempts. He was attacked by a few Russian forces simultaneously.  Langiewicz defeated them all in many skirmishes. Polish forces grew to 2,600 men most of them peasants armed with scythes. Russian colonel Dobrowolski attacked near Małogoszcz. The Russians shelled Polish positions, but their attack was eventually smashed by a Polish cavalry counterattack. Langiewicz ordered a retreat. The battle was indecisive - the Russians failed to annihilate the Polish army and the Polish failed to defend their positions.

References
 

Conflicts in 1863
1863 in Poland
Battles of the January Uprising
February 1863 events